The Perpignan crash occurred when a train crashed into a school bus on a level crossing between Millas and Saint-Féliu-d'Amont in the Arrondissement of Perpignan in the French province of Occitanie at about 4pm on 14 December 2017. The bus was severed into two. Four pupils on board were killed on the day, and 24 were seriously injured – one of whom died the following day. A sixth fatality was recorded on 18 December. Trains between Perpignan and Villefranche were cancelled.

Investigation 
While visiting the scene, Prime Minister Édouard Philippe said that the "circumstances of this terrible drama are still undetermined." The Minister of Transport Élisabeth Borne also visited the scene. An SNCF official said "several witnesses said the barrier was down" at the time of the crash. According to her employer, the bus driver says that the barriers were up and safe. Drugs and alcohol tests for both the train and the bus drivers were negative.

References

2017 road incidents in Europe
2010s road incidents in France
Bus incidents in France
December 2017 events in France
Level crossing incidents in France
Perpignan
Railway accidents in 2017
History of Pyrénées-Orientales
2017 disasters in France